Russia 88 is a 2009 Russian mockumentary film directed by Pavel Bardin about Russian neo-Nazis. It was screened in the Panorama section at the Berlin International Film Festival. Director Pavel Bardin won the Discovery of the Year Nika Award for the picture.

In the film, members of a gang called Russia 88 are filming propaganda videos to post on the Internet. After a while, they become accustomed to the camera and stop paying attention to it. The leader of the gang, Spike, discovers that his sister is dating a Southern Caucasian man. This family drama develops into a tragedy.

The movie has no ending credits, but a list of people killed by skinheads in Russia in 2008 at the end, playing over silence.

References

External links 
 
 
 Brief description

2009 films
2000s mockumentary films
2009 crime drama films
Russian crime drama films
Films about race and ethnicity
Skinhead films